The Catalan Atlas is a medieval world map, or mappa mundi, created in 1375 that has been described as the most important map of the Middle Ages in the Catalan language, and as "the zenith of medieval map-work".  

It was produced by the Majorcan cartographic school, possibly by Cresques Abraham, a Jewish book illuminator who was described by a contemporary as a master of mappae mundi as well as of compasses. It was in the royal library of France by 1380, during the reign of King Charles V, and is still preserved in the Bibliothèque nationale de France. The Catalan Atlas originally consisted of six vellum leaves (each circa ) folded vertically, painted in various colours including gold and silver. They were later mounted on the front and back of five wooden panels, with the ends enclosed in a leather binding by Simon Vostre c.1515, restored most recently in 1991. Wear has split each leaf into two.

Description

The first two leaves contain texts in Catalan covering cosmography, astronomy, and astrology. These texts are accompanied by illustrations. The texts and illustration emphasise the Earth's spherical shape and the state of the known world. They also provide information to sailors on tides and how to tell time at night.

The four remaining leaves make up the actual map, with Jerusalem located close to the centre; two depict the Orient; the remaining two show Europe, along with North and West Africa. It shows illustrations of many cities—Christian cities with a cross, other cities with a dome—and with each city's political allegiance indicated by a flag. Wavy blue vertical lines are used to symbolise oceans. Place names of important ports are transcribed in red, while others are indicated in black. The illustrations and most of the text are oriented towards the edges of the map, suggesting it was intended to be used by laying it flat and walking around it.

The oriental portion of the Catalan Atlas illustrates numerous religious references as well as a synthesis of medieval mappae mundi and the travel literature of the time, especially Marco Polo's Book of Marvels and Mandeville's Travels and Voyage of Sir John Mandeville. Many Indian and Chinese cities can be identified. The explanatory texts report customs described by Polo and catalogue local economic resources, real or supposed.

The Western portion is similar to contemporary portolan charts, but contains the first compass rose known to have been used on such a chart.

Mali Empire

The Mali Empire and its riches are shown under the rule of Mansa Musa. The caption reads:

India

The western part of the Indian subcontinent is clearly depicted, and several of the location names are accurate. To the north appears the Sultan of Delhi (Rey de delli), the ruler of the contemporary Delhi Sultanate, with his flag on numerous cities. The caption reads:

In the center of India appears the traditional Yadava capital of Diogil ("Deogiri", or Devagiri ). On top of the city of Diogil floats a peculiar flag, while coastal cities are under the black flag of the Delhi Sultanate. Devagiri was ultimately captured by Alauddin Khalji of the Delhi Sultanate in 1307. The trading ship raises the flag of the Ilkhanate. Its caption reads:

To the south , at the tip of India, appears the "King of Colombo" with a Christian flag. He was identified as Christian due to the early Saint Thomas Christianity there (since at least the 8th century), and the Catholic mission there under Jordanus since 1329. His caption reads:

Jordanus, Christian missionary to Colombo from 1329, who wrote "Book of Marvels" (Mirabilia descripta, 1340), was probably the source of the information about Colombo in the Catalan Atlas. He mentions the earlier presence of the Saint Thomas Christians in India.

Il-Khanate

The Mongol Il-Khanate ruler and his dominions are depicted in the area of Persia under the title "Rey del tauris", after his capital city of Tabriz. The Ilkhanate flag also appears: .

The caption is only related to the city of Babylon:

Over him appears a city within a sphere, with the following caption, mentioning the Persian city of Shiraz and Ptolemy:

Two ships with flags of the Ilkhanate appears on the India Ocean, sailing to and from the Indian coast, where appear flags of the Delhi Sultanate. The label attached to one of the ships reads:

Golden Horde

The Mongol polity of the Golden Horde is accurately depicted north of the Caspian sea. The ruler named Jani Beg has been identified in this representation, being mentioned as "Jambech senyor de Sarra", and the flag of the Golden Horde also appears. The caption to the right reads:

The symbolism of the Golden Horde flag depicted by the Catalan Atlas is fairly similar to the type of tamgha symbols (such as ) actually found on the coinage of the Golden Horde. Such symbols were used until the time of Jani Beg, but essentially disappear thereafter.

The text to the left reads:

Anatolia

The Anatolian Beyliks, a group of Turkic principalities in Anatolia are also depicted, in the region labelled Turqhia (Turkey). The caption next to the seated ruler in Anatolia reads: Asia Minor also called Turkey, where there are many cities and castles. Numerous Turkic principalities appear, with a variety a flags, but very little prominence is given to the Orthodox princes of the Byzantine Empire, although several Byzantine cities appear with the Byzantine imperial flag, or Trebizond. The Christian kingdom of Cilician Armenia appears heavily fortified within green walls, with its ports and flags clearly visible.

Gog and Magog

The land of "Gog i Magog" (Gog and Magog) appear in the top right corner. Its king is mounted on a horse, followed by a procession. Next to it appears Alexander's Gate, showing Alexander, the Antichrist, and mechanical trumpeters.

Chagatai Khanate

The Khan Kebek, Mongol ruler of the Chagatai Khanate is depicted with the following caption:

His cities appear with the Chagatai flag.

Cathay (China)

The cities of Cathay, at that time the Empire of the Great Khan (Yuan China), are shown raising a flag with three red crescent moons. The flag is seen all over eastern Asian cities in the Catalan Atlas.

Kubilai Khan appears enthroned and wearing a green coat, with the following caption:

Antichrist

The Antichrist appears beyond the Great Wall of China, next to the territory of Gog and Magog. The label reads:

In the top corner is Alexander the Great ("Allexandri") fighting the devil.

Beyond is the ocean ("Mare Oceanis"), without mention of Japan.

Gallery

See also

 Rhumbline network
 Early world maps

References

Further reading

External links 

 Bibliothèque nationale de France – L'Atlas Catalan 
 Complete transcription of the Catalan language text, and translation to French (1839): 
  The Catalan Atlas  [via archive.org]
 www.cresquesproject.net – translation of the works of Riera i Sans and Gabriel Llompart on the Jewish Majorcan Map-makers of the Late Middle Ages 
 Abraham Cresques ? Atlas de cartes marines, dit [Atlas catalan], gallica.bnf.fr

Atlases
History of Catalonia
History of the Balearic Islands
14th century in Aragon
1370s works
Bibliothèque nationale de France collections
14th-century maps
Historic maps of the world